Sofie Juárez (born 9 April 1991) is an alpine skier from Andorra.  She competed for Andorra at the 2010 Winter Olympics.  She did not finish either of her events.

References

External links
 
 
 

1991 births
Living people
Andorran female alpine skiers
Olympic alpine skiers of Andorra
Alpine skiers at the 2010 Winter Olympics